Galya Morrell (born 1961) is an Arctic explorer and ice artist who is a member of one of the Komi peoples. Her husband is American.

References

External links 
Galya Morrell website
 

1961 births
Living people
Explorers of the Arctic
20th-century American women artists
21st-century American women artists
20th-century Russian women artists
21st-century Russian women artists
Komi people